Joe Simmonds  (born 19 December 1996) is  an English rugby union player for Premiership Rugby side Exeter Chiefs. He plays as a fly-half and is the first team captain.

Early life
Simmonds grew up in Teignmouth, Devon, where his father and uncle are both in the fishing industry.

His elder brother is Sam Simmonds. In their youth, both attended the Rugby Academy at Ivybridge Community College.

Rugby playing career
Simmonds made his full debut for Exeter on 4 March 2018 against Saracens and was named man of the match.

The following week he kicked the winning penalty as Exeter beat the Newcastle Falcons to advance to the Anglo-Welsh Cup final.

In the final, rearranged to March 30 due to snow, Simmonds kicked 13 points as the Chiefs won the cup 28–11 against Bath Rugby. The previous season he had played in the Anglo-Welsh Cup final but Exeter lost to Leicester Tigers on that occasion.

Simmonds was made captain of Exeter Chiefs in the European Rugby Champions Cup when Exeter played Glasgow Warriors in round five of the Cup in January 2020.  Jack Yeandle remained the club captain.

Simmonds led Exeter on the pitch in the delayed final of the 2020 Champions Cup.  Simmonds is the youngest player to captain a side to victory in the final of the European Cup.  He also won 'Star of the Match' for his performance in that game, and kicked 5 successful kicks out of 5 attempts. He was top points scorer in the 2019–20 European Rugby Champions Cup.

Honours

Heineken Champions Cup
Winners: 2019-20

Premiership Rugby
Winners: 2019-20

Runners-up: 2018-19, 2017–18

Anglo-Welsh Cup
Winners 2017–18

Runner-Up 2016–17
Devon Intermediate Cup 2015 winner Teignmouth RFC https://www.youtube.com/watch?v=xvKhLRStefQ

References

1996 births
Living people
English rugby union players
Exeter Chiefs players
Members of the Order of the British Empire
Rugby union players from Torquay
Rugby union fly-halves